The 2006 International Pokka 1000 km was the sixth round of the 2006 Super GT season and the 35th running of the 1000 km Suzuka. It took place on August 20, 2006.

Race results
Results are as follows: 

 – The #23 Nissan Z was disqualified after driver Yuji Ide failed to serve a drive-through penalty after a collision with the #55 Ford GT.

Statistics
GT500 Pole Position – #12 Impul Z – 1:56.426
GT300 Pole Position – #52 Cerumo Celica – 2:07.126
GT500 Fastest Lap – #12 Impul Z – 1:58.829
GT300 Fastest Lap – #19 WedsSport Celica – 2:08.824
Winner's Race Time – 5:57:45.468

References

Suzuka 1000km